On 7 February 2021, the Congolese health ministry announced that a new case of Ebola near Butembo, North Kivu had been detected the previous day. The case was a 42-year-old woman who had symptoms of Ebola in Biena on 1 February 2021. A few days after, she died in a hospital in Butembo. The WHO said that more than 70 people who had contact with the woman had been tracked.

On 3 May 2021, the 12th EVD outbreak was declared over, resulting in 12 cases and six deaths. Heightened surveillance will continue for 90 days after the declaration, in case of resurgence.

History

See also
 Western African Ebola virus epidemic
 Kivu Ebola epidemic
 Post-Ebola virus syndrome

References

Further reading
 
 

Ebola outbreaks